Absalonsen is a surname. Notable people with the surname include:

Johan Absalonsen (born 1985), Danish footballer
 

Surnames of Scandinavian origin